Just You and Me may refer to:
Just You and Me (Herb Alpert album) (1976)
Just You and Me (Adie album) (2010)
"Just You 'n' Me", a 1973 song by James Pankow for Chicago, covered many others
"Just You and Me", a 1980 song by Paul Jabara from The Third Album
"Just You and Me", a 1975 song by Tamiko Jones
"Just You and Me", a 1981 song by the Birthday Party from Prayers on Fire

See also 
 Just Me and You, a 1989 American television film
 Just Me and You, a 2019 Canadian film
 Just You, Just Me, a 1953 album by Lester Young